Lutfi Zohidova (6 November 1925  10 October 1995) was a Soviet and Tajik ballet dancer.

Biography 
Zohidova was born in Konibodom, and became a member of the Communist Party of the Soviet Union in 1957. She studied at the Dushanbe Women's Pedagogical Institute, and from 1939 until 1941 was a member of the Union of Workers Ensemble in Moscow; in the latter year she was accepted as a member of the Tajik Ballet. Her debut with the company came in La fille mal gardée by Peter Ludwig Hertel, and she performed as a soloist at the theater throughout the 1940s and 1950s. Among the most notable roles which she essayed during her career were Maria in The Fountain of Bakhchisarai by Boris Asafyev; Odette in Swan Lake by Pyotr Ilyich Tchaikovsky; Layla in Layla and Majnun by Sergey Balasanian; and the title roles in Cinderella by Sergei Prokofiev; La Esmeralda by Cesare Pugni, and Dilbar by Alexander Lensky. She also directed the Dushanbe School of Choreography for a time. She toured with the company in June 1961, and shortly thereafter, retired from the ballet and became an instructor.

Awards and honors 

 Stalin Prize, 2nd class (1949) – for her portrayal of Layla in ballet play Layla and Majnun by Sergey Balasanian
 People's Artist of the Tajik SSR (1949)
 Order of the Badge of Honour (1954)
 People's Artist of the USSR (1957)
 Order of Friendship of Peoples
 Order of the Red Banner of Labour

References

1925 births
1995 deaths
20th-century ballet dancers
People from Konibodom
Communist Party of the Soviet Union members
People's Artists of Tajikistan
People's Artists of the USSR
Stalin Prize winners
Recipients of the Order of Friendship of Peoples
Recipients of the Order of the Red Banner of Labour
Soviet ballerinas
Soviet female dancers
Tajikistani ballet dancers